Abbas Ali

People
 Abbas Ali Khalatbari (1912–1979), Iranian diplomat
 Abbas Ali (Indian National Army) (1920–2014), officer of the Indian National Army and politician
 Abbas Ali (cricketer) (born 1976), former Indian cricketer
 Abbas Ali (footballer) (born 1990), Pakistani footballer
 Abbas (actor) (Mirza Abbas Ali, born 1975), Indian film actor and model
 Abbas ibn Ali (647–680), known as Mother of the Sons
 Abbas Ali, singer from SuperStar (Arabic TV series)

Places 
 Abbas Ali, Ardabil, a village in Iran
 Abbas Ali, Khuzestan, a village in Iran

See also